Rowland Beckett is an Australian former rugby league footballer  who played for Cronulla-Sutherland and Eastern Suburbs in the New South Wales Rugby League premiership competition; his position of choice was at hooker.

He played eight seasons at Cronula between 1976-1983. He finished his career at Eastern Suburbs in 1984.

Career highlights

Junior Club: Como Jannali Rugby League Football Club
Career Stats: 84 career games to date scoring 58 points

References

Australian rugby league players
Cronulla-Sutherland Sharks players
Sydney Roosters players
Living people
Year of birth missing (living people)
Rugby league hookers
Rugby league players from Brisbane